Luz Adiela Alvarez Salazar (born February 20, 1987 in Valle del Cauca Department) is a female judoka from Colombia.

Bio
Alvarez is a member of Liga Vallecaucana de Judo club and trains with world champion and Olympian Yuri Alvear.

Judo
She is a member of Colombian national judo squad in extra-lightweight category and is a medal winner from continental games and championships.

Achievements

References

External links
 
 

1987 births
Living people
Sportspeople from Valle del Cauca Department
Colombian female judoka
Judoka at the 2011 Pan American Games
Judoka at the 2015 Pan American Games
Central American and Caribbean Games bronze medalists for Colombia
Competitors at the 2006 Central American and Caribbean Games
South American Games bronze medalists for Colombia
South American Games medalists in judo
Competitors at the 2010 South American Games
Competitors at the 2014 South American Games
Central American and Caribbean Games medalists in judo
Pan American Games competitors for Colombia
Judoka at the 2020 Summer Olympics
Olympic judoka of Colombia
20th-century Colombian women
21st-century Colombian women